The Muslim Saifi, or sometimes pronounced Barhai are Muslim community, found in North India. They are also known as Saifi which denotes the Muslim sub-caste of blacksmiths and carpenters. A small number are also found in the Terai region of Nepal. The community is also sometimes referred to as Saifi or Tarkhan descendent of Tarkhan Dynasty of Sindh Pakistan.

Origin

The community derive their name from the word barhai, which means carpenter in Hindi. According to their own traditions, they are descended from early Muslim settlers to India. It is however likely, that they are immigrant from the Central Asia.They are also known as Tarkhan.

In Uttar Pradesh, the Barhai/ Saifi have two sub-divisions, the Tarkhan and the Multani or immigrants from Multan known as Multani Lohar

Each of these two groups in endogamous. They are found mainly in the Doab and Rohilkhand regions, and speak the hindi dialect. The community has been granted Other Backward Class status.
The term Saifi refers to Sword makers during medieval times.

Present circumstances

The Behna are no longer mainly employed mainly as carpenters, and many work in farming. They are largely small and medium sized farmers, although a sizeable number are agricultural labourers, and live in multi caste and multi religious settlements, but occupy their own distinct quarters. Each settlement has a caste council, known as a panchayat, which acts as an instrument of social control. It deals with intra community disputes, as well as punishing those who breach communal norms. Although they live in close proximity to other Muslim groups, such as the Shaikh,  Gaddi, Ansari, Rajput Muslim and Qassab in Doab, and the Muslim Teli, Muslim Banjara, Baghban and Rohilla in Rohilkhand, there is very little interaction, and virtually no intermarriage. The only group with which close relations are maintained are the Saifi, and this includes intermarriage. With regards to neighbouring Hindu groups such the Jat and Gujjar, a social distance is maintained.

The Barhai are Sunni Muslim of the Barelvi & Deobandi sect. They speak Urdu, and various dialects of Hindi. There customs are similar to other Uttar Pradesh Muslims.

Notable People

• Arif Lohar, Pakistani  Singer
'''[{Mohd Uvais }]' Certified  Education Counsellor -Gawan Sambhal

References

Social groups of Uttar Pradesh
Muslim communities of Uttar Pradesh
Muslim communities of India